The Prince-Archbishopric of Salzburg was an ecclesiastical principality and state of the Holy Roman Empire. It comprised the secular territory ruled by the archbishops of Salzburg, as distinguished from the much larger Catholic diocese founded in 739 by Saint Boniface in the German stem duchy of Bavaria.

From the late 13th century onwards, the archbishops gradually reached the status of Imperial immediacy and independence from the Bavarian dukes. Salzburg remained an ecclesiastical principality until its secularisation to the short-lived Electorate of Salzburg (later Duchy of Salzburg) in 1803. The last prince-archbishop exercising secular authority was Count Hieronymus von Colloredo, who was a patron of the Salzburg-native composer, Wolfgang Amadeus Mozart.

Geography

The prince-archbishopric's territory was roughly congruent with the present-day Austrian state of Salzburg. It stretched along the Salzach river from the High Tauern range—Mt. Großvenediger at —at the main chain of the Alps in the south down to the Alpine foothills in the north. Here it also comprised the present-day Rupertiwinkel on the western shore of the Salzach, which today is part of Bavaria. The former archepiscopal lands are traditionally subdivided into five historic parts (Gaue): Flachgau with the Salzburg capital and Tennengau around Hallein are both located in the broad Salzach valley at the rim of the Northern Limestone Alps; the mountainous (Innergebirg) southern divisions are Pinzgau, Pongau around Bischofshofen, and southeastern Lungau beyond the Radstädter Tauern Pass.

In the north and east, the prince-archbishopric bordered on the Duchy of Austria, a former Bavarian margraviate, which had become independent in 1156 and, raised to an archduchy in 1457, developed as the nucleus of the Habsburg monarchy. The Salzkammergut border region, today a UNESCO World Heritage Site, as an important salt trade region was gradually seized by the mighty House of Habsburg and incorporated into the Upper Austrian lands. In the southeast, Salzburg adjoined the Duchy of Styria, also ruled by the Habsburg (arch-)dukes in personal union since 1192. By 1335, the Austrian regents had also acquired the old Duchy of Carinthia in the south, the Styrian and Carinthian territories were incorporated into Inner Austria in 1379. The Habsburg encirclement was nearly completed, when in 1363 the archdukes also attained the County of Tyrol in the west. Only in the northwest did Salzburg bordered on the Duchy of Bavaria (raised to an Electorate in 1623), and the tiny Berchtesgaden Provostry, which was able to retain its independence until the Mediatisation in 1803.

Previous history
The Vita Sancti Severini biography by the Early Christian chronicler Eugippius reported that during the Decline of the Roman Empire about 450 AD the local capital Iuvavum in the Noricum ripense province was already home to two churches and a monastery. Very little is known of the early bishopric during the Migration Period, and the legendary Saint Maximus of Salzburg is the only abbot-bishop known by name. A disciple of Saint Severinus, he was martyred in the retreat from Noricum, after the Germanic Western Roman officer Odoacer had deposed the last Emperor Romulus Augustulus and declared himself King of Italy in 476. In his conflict with the Rugii tribes, Odoacer had his brother Onoulphus evacuate the Noricum ripense province in 487/88, whereby Iuvavum was abandoned and with it the bishopric. Saint Severinus had already died in 482 in the castrum of Favianis (present-day Mautern in Lower Austria), six years before the departure of the Roman legions from the region.

Bavarian bishopric (c. 543/698–798)

From the sixth century onwards, the northern areas of the later archbishopric were resettled by Germanic Bavarii tribes, who established themselves among the remaining Romance population, while Slavic tribes moved into the southern Pongau and Lungau parts. About 696 Saint Rupert, then Bishop of Worms in Frankish Austrasia and later called the apostle of Bavaria and Carinthia, came to the region from the Bavarian town Regensburg and laid the foundations for the re-establishment of the Salzburg diocese. After erecting a church at nearby Seekirchen he discovered the ruins of Iuvavum overgrown with brambles and remnants of the Romance population, who had maintained Christian traditions. The former theory that he arrived already in c. 543 during the time of the unsourced early Bavarian dukes appears less likely than that he worked during the reign of the Agilolfing duke Theodo II (c. 680–717), when the Bavarian stem duchy came under Frankish supremacy. The bishops of Salzburg traditionally marked the foundation of their diocese as being the year 582, and struck coins commemorating the 1,200 year anniversary of the event in 1782. In any case, it was not until after 700 that Christian civilisation re-emerged in the region.

Rupert established a monastery dedicated to Saint Peter at the site of a Late Antique church in former Iuvavum. St Peter's Abbey received large estates in the Flachgau (Rupertiwinkel) and Tennengau regions from the hands of Duke Theodon II, including several brine wells and salt evaporation ponds which earned Iuvavum its German name Salzburg. In 711 Rupert also founded the Cella Maximiliana in the Pongau region, the later town of Bischofshofen. His niece Erentrude established a Benedictine nunnery at nearby Nonnberg about 713. In 739 Archbishop Boniface, with the blessing of Pope Gregory III, completed the work of Saint Rupert and raised Salzburg to a bishopric, placed under the primatial see of the Archdiocese of Mainz. St. Vergilius, abbot of St. Peter's since about 749, had quarrelled with St. Boniface over the existence of antipodes. He nevertheless became bishop about 767.

Early archbishopric (798–1060)
Arno, bishop since 785, enjoyed the respect of the Frankish king Charlemagne who assigned to him the missionary territory between the rivers Danube in the north, the Rába (Raab) in the east and the Drava in the south, an area which had recently been conquered from the Avars. Monasteries were founded and all of Carinthia was slowly Christianised. While Arno was in Rome attending to some of Charlemagne's business in 798, Pope Leo III appointed him Archbishop over the other bishops in Bavaria (Freising, Passau, Regensburg, and Säben). When the dispute over the ecclesiastical border between Salzburg and the Patriarchate of Aquileia broke out, Charlemagne declared the Drava to be the border.

Archbishop Adalwin (859–873) suffered great troubles when King Rastislav of Moravia attempted to remove his realm from the ecclesiastical influence of East Francia. In 870 Pope Adrian II appointed the "Apostle of the Slavs" St. Methodius the Archbishop of Pannonia and Moravia at Sirmium, entrusting him large territories under the overlordship of the Salzburg diocese. It was only when Rastislav and Methodius were captured by King Louis the German that Adalwin could adequately protest the invasion of his rights. Methodius appeared at the Synod of Salzburg where he was struck in the face and imprisoned in close confinement for two and a half years.

Soon after, the Magyars ravaged Great Moravia and not a church was left standing in Pannonia. Archbishop Dietmar I fell in battle in 907. It was not until the Battle of Lechfeld in 955 that the Magyars suffered a crushing defeat, and ecclesiastical life in Salzburg returned to normal. The following year after Archbishop Herhold allied with Liudolf, Duke of Swabia and Duke Conrad the Red of Lorraine, he was deposed, imprisoned, blinded, and banished. Archbishop Bruno of Cologne, called the Bishop-Maker, appointed Frederick I archbishop and declared the Abbacy of St. Peter independent.

Investiture era (1060–1213)
In the era beginning with Pope Gregory VII, the Latin Christendom entered a period of internal conflict.  The first archbishop of the era was Gebhard, who during the Investiture Controversy remained on the side of the Pope. Gebhard thus suffered a nine-year exile, and was allowed to return shortly before his death and was buried in Admont. After King Henry IV abdicated and Conrad I of Abensberg was elected Archbishop. Conrad lived in exile until the Calistine Concordat of 1122. Conrad spent the remaining years of his episcopate improving the religious life in the archdiocese.

Prince-archbishopric

Archbishop Eberhard II of Regensberg was made a prince of the Empire in 1213, and created three new sees: Chiemsee (1216), Seckau (1218) and Lavant (1225). In 1241, at the Council of Regensburg he denounced Pope Gregory IX as "that man of perdition, whom they call Antichrist, who in his extravagant boasting says, I am God, I cannot err."  During the German Interregnum, Salzburg suffered confusion. Philip of Spanheim, heir to the Dukedom of Carinthia, refused to take priestly consecrations, and was replaced by Ulrich, Bishop of Seckau.

King Rudolph I of Habsburg quarrelled with the archbishops through the manipulations of Abbot Henry of Admont, and after his death the archbishops and the Habsburgs made peace in 1297. The people and archbishops of Salzburgs remained loyal to the Habsburgs in their struggles against the Wittelsbachs. When the Black Death reached Salzburg in 1347, the Jews were accused of poisoning the wells and suffered severe persecution.

In 1473, he summoned the first provincial diet in the history of the archbishopric, and eventually abdicated.  It was only Leonard of Keutschach (reigned 1495–1519) who reversed the situation. He had all the burgomasters and town councillors (who were levying unfair taxes) arrested simultaneously and imprisoned in the castle.  His last years were spent in bitter struggle against Matthäus Lang of Wellenburg, Bishop of Gurk, who succeeded him in 1519.

Matthäus Lang was largely unnoticed in official circles, although his influence was felt throughout the archbishopric. He brought in Saxon miners, which brought with them Protestant books and teachings. He then attempted to keep the populace Catholic, and during the Latin War was besieged in the Hohen-Salzburg, declared a "monster" by Martin Luther, and two later uprisings by the peasants lead to suffering to the entire archdiocese. Later bishops were wiser in the ruling and spared Salzburg the religious wars and devastation seen elsewhere in Germany.   Archbishop Wolf Dietrich von Raitenau gave the Protestants the choice of converting to Catholicism or leaving Salzburg. The cathedral was rebuilt in such splendour that it was unrivalled by all others north of the Alps.

Archbishop Paris of Lodron led Salzburg to peace and prosperity during the Thirty Years' War in which the rest of Germany was thoroughly devastated. During the reign of Leopold Anthony of Firmian, the remaining Protestants in Salzburg were expelled in 1731.  He invited the Jesuits to Salzburg and asked for help from the emperor, and finally ordered the Protestants to recant their beliefs or emigrate. Over 20,000 Salzburg Protestants were forced to leave their homes, most of whom accepted an offer of land by King Frederick William I of Prussia.

The last Prince-Archbishop, Hieronymus von Colloredo, is probably best known for his patronage of Mozart. His reforms of the church and education systems alienated him from the people.

Secularisation
In 1803, Salzburg was secularised as the Electorate of Salzburg for the former Grand Duke Ferdinand III of Tuscany (brother of Emperor Francis II), who had lost his throne. In 1805, it became part of Austria. In 1809, it became part of Bavaria which closed the University of Salzburg, banned monasteries from accepting novices, and banned pilgrimages and processions. The archdiocese was reestablished as the Roman Catholic Archdiocese of Salzburg in 1818 without temporal power.

Up to today, the Archbishop of Salzburg has also borne the title Primas Germaniae ("First Bishop of Germany"). The powers of this title – non-jurisdictional – are limited to being the Pope's first correspondent in the German-speaking world, but had once included the right to preside over the Princes of the Holy Roman Empire. The Archbishop also has the title of Legatus Natus ("born legate") to the Pope, which, although not a cardinal, gives the Archbishop the privilege of wearing red vesture (which is much deeper than a cardinal's scarlet), even in Rome.

Bishops of Salzburg
 Rupert of Salzburg 696–716/18
 ...
 Virgil of Salzburg 746–784
 Arno of Salzburg 784–821
 Adalram 821–836
 ...
 Dietmar I 874–907
 Pilgrim I 907–923
 ...
 Gebhard of Salzburg 1060-1088
 Thiemo 1090-1102
 Conrad I of Babenberg 1106–1147
 Eberhard von Biburg 1147–1164
 Conrad II of Babenberg 1164–1168
 Adalbert III of Bohemia 1168-1177
 Conrad of Wittelsbach 1177-1183
 Adalbert III of Bohemia 1183-1200
 ...
 Philip of Spanheim 1247–1256
 Ulrich von Seckau 1256-1265
 Ladislaus of Salzburg 1265-1270
 ...
 Frederick III of Leibnitz 1315–1338
 Henry of Pirnbrunn 1338–1343
 Ordulf of Wiesseneck 1343–1365
 Pilgrim II of Pucheim 1365–1396
 Gregor Schenk of Osterwitz 1396–1403
 Eberhard III of Neuhaus 1403–1427
 Eberhard IV of Starhemberg 1427–1429
 John II of Reichensperg 1429–1441
 Frederick IV Truchseß of Emmerberg 1441–1452
 Sigismund I of Volkersdorf 1452–1461
 Cardinal Burchard of Weissbruch 1461–1466
 Bernhard II of Rohr 1466–1482
 John III Peckenschlager 1482–1489
 Friedrich V of Schallenburg 1489–1494
 Sigismund II of Hollenegg 1494–1495
 Leonhard von Keutschach 1495–1519
 Matthäus Lang von Wellenburg 1519–1540
 Ernest of Bavaria 1540–1554
 Michael of Khuenburg 1554–1560
 John Jacob of Khun-Bellasy 1560–1586
 George of Kuenburg 1586–1587
 Wolf Dietrich von Raitenau 1587–1612
 Marcus Sittich of Hohenems 1612–1619
 Paris von Lodron 1619–1653
 Guidobald of Thun 1654–1668
 Maximilian Gandalf of Kuenburg 1668–1687
 Johann Ernst von Thun 1687–1709
 Franz Anton von Harrach 1709–1727
 Leopold Anton von Firmian 1727–1744
 Jacob Ernest of Liechtenstein-Castelcorno 1744–1747
 Andreas Jacob of Dietrichstein 1747–1753
 Sigismund III of Schrattenbach 1753–1771
 Hieronymus von Colloredo 1772–1812 (last prince-archbishop, lost temporal power in 1803 after secularization)

See Roman Catholic Archdiocese of Salzburg for archbishops since 1812.

See also 
 Alte Residenz – city palace
 Schloss Hellbrunn – summer palace

References

External links 

 Salzburg at the Catholic Encyclopædia.
 Legate at the Catholic Encyclopædia.

Bavarian Circle
Prince-bishoprics of the Holy Roman Empire in Austria
Catholic Church in Austria
Archbishopric
1270s establishments in the Holy Roman Empire
1278 establishments in Europe
1803 disestablishments in the Holy Roman Empire